Lillian Forrester ( Williamson; born 1879) was a British suffragette who led an attack on the Manchester Art Gallery.

Life
She was born Lillian Williamson in 1879, and was the second daughter of Arthur Williamson, a commercial clerk, and Elizabeth Hall. In 1901 she was attending Owen's College, which later became Victoria University of Manchester. At one point she said she had a degree in History.

In 1911 Forrester was invited to Eagle House near Bath by Linley and Emily Blathwayt. The Blathwayts invited leading suffragettes to visit their house. They created over 40 memorial trees to celebrate these visits in what was known as 'Annie's Arbour'.

Forrester led an attack on the Manchester Art Gallery on 3 April 1913. She, Evelyn Manesta and Annie Briggs waited until the gallery was closing and then proceeded to break the glass on many of the most valuable paintings. The three attacked the glass of thirteen paintings including two by John Everett Millais and two by George Frederick Watts. Staff were alerted by the sound of broken glass and the three were apprehended. Four of the paintings had been damaged by the broken glass. They were bailed to appear before magistrates the next day.

Briggs persuaded the court that she had been present but had not been involved. Evelyn Manesta was given a sentence of a month and Forrester's sentence was three months for malicious damage.

While she was imprisoned she and Manesta were secretly photographed and pictures of them were circulated with pictures of other militant suffragettes to police and art gallery staff. Manesta's photograph was modified to hide that she was being held around the neck whilst the photograph was taken.

Paintings involved
The Last Watch of Hero and Captive Andromache by Lord Frederic Leighton
The Last of the Garrison by Briton Riviere
Birnam Woods by John Everett Millais
The Prayer and Portrait of The Hon J L Motley by George Frederick Watts
A Flood by John Everett Millais
When Apples were Golden by John Melhuish Strudwick
The Shadow of Death by William Holman Hunt
Astarte Syriaca by Dante Gabriel Rossetti
Sybilla Delphica by Edward Burne-Jones
Paola and Francesca by George Frederick Watts
The Syrinx by Arthur Hacker

References

1879 births
Year of death missing
British female criminals
British women's rights activists
Women's suffrage in the United Kingdom
English suffragists
Eagle House suffragettes
Prisoners and detainees of England and Wales
20th-century British criminals